George Butler (20 February 1810 – 23 April 1887) was an English professional cricketer who played first-class cricket from 1841 to 1852.  He was mainly associated with Nottinghamshire County Cricket Club and made 36 known appearances in first-class matches.

References

1810 births
1887 deaths
English cricketers
English cricketers of 1826 to 1863
Nottinghamshire cricketers
Midland Counties cricketers
Players cricketers
North v South cricketers
All-England Eleven cricketers
Nottingham Cricket Club cricketers
Players of Nottinghamshire cricketers
Gentlemen of Southwell cricketers
Fast v Slow cricketers